Ralph Spinella (May 8, 1923 – October 7, 2021) was an American fencer. He competed in the individual and team épée events at the 1960 Summer Olympics.

References

External links
 

1923 births
2021 deaths
American male épée fencers
Fencers at the 1960 Summer Olympics
Fencers at the 1967 Pan American Games
Olympic fencers of the United States
Pan American Games gold medalists for the United States
Pan American Games medalists in fencing
Sportspeople from Waterbury, Connecticut